Damani Thompson, known by the stage names, Phesto and Phesto Dee (born April 29, 1974), is an American rapper and producer.  He is one of the founding four members of the Oakland, California-based underground hip hop group Souls of Mischief, and, with the Souls of Mischief, a part of the eight-person, alternative hip hop collective, the Hieroglyphics.

Biography 
Born and raised in Oakland, California, Phesto D met fellow Souls of Mischief member Tajai, as well as Hieroglyphics' founder, Del tha Funkee Homosapien, in junior high school. Tajai introduced Phesto to members A-Plus and Opio, and the group formed in high school before releasing their debut album, 93 'til Infinity on Jive Records in 1993.

As a rapper, Phesto is "renown[ed] for his crazy, and up-tempo flows. Rhyming about anything from 'quantum cryptography' to secret Jedi mind tricks, Phesto's skills are undoubtedly a vital piece of the Hieroglyphics foundation.".

Phesto has contributed to all four Souls of Mischief albums, as well as the two Hieroglyphic studio albums.  He has also produced or performed on solo projects of various Hieroglyphics' members.

Discography

Solo
Granite Pedigree - EP (2011)
Background Check (2012)
Infrared Rum (2014)

With Souls of Mischief
93 'til Infinity (1993)
No Man's Land  (1995)
Focus (1997)
Trilogy: Conflict, Climax, Resolution (2000) 
Montezuma's Revenge (2009)
There Is Only Now (2015)

With Hieroglyphics
 3rd Eye Vision (1998)
 Full Circle (2003)
 The Kitchen (2013)

References

External links 
 Discogs Profile - Phesto
 Hieroglyphics - Official Site

1974 births
Living people
Hieroglyphics (group) members
Rappers from Oakland, California
21st-century American rappers
21st-century American male musicians